The Do Book Company is an independent publishing house based in London, England. They publish books by speakers from the Do Lectures and are represented by Publishers Group UK.

History 

The Do Book Company was founded in May 2013 by Miranda West, their offices are based in Shoreditch, London. They are partnered with Do Lectures and publish authors who have spoken at the event. Since founding they have published five books, and have successfully crowdfunded Do Purpose by David Hieatt, through Unbound.

References

External links 
  The Do Book Company Website
  The Do Book Company Blog
 The Do Book Company Twitter

Small press publishing companies
Book publishing companies based in London
Publishing companies established in 2013
Publishing companies based in London
British companies established in 2013